Pelocetidae is an extinct family of baleen whales. Existed during the Miocene in North America, Europe, Australia and Japan.

References 

Baleen whales
Prehistoric mammal families
Miocene first appearances